Reinhard Kapp (born 13 May 1947 in Hof, Bavaria) is a German musicologist whose work focuses on Robert Schumann.

Publications 
 Reinhard Kapp (editor): Notizbuch 5/6. Musik, Berlin, Vienna 1982, S. 253ff. 
 Schumann in his time and since. In Beate Perrey (editor): The Cambridge Companion to Schumann. 2007, . Publication of the German original with the permission of Cambridge University Press.
 Reinhard Kapp: Chronologisches Verzeichnis (in progress) der auf Orpheus (und/oder Eurydike) bezogenen oder zu beziehenden Opern, Kantaten, Instrumentalmusiken, literarischen Texte, Theaterstücke, Filme und historiographischen Arbeiten.
 Reinhard Kapp: Von der Sprache der Seele. In line (PDF file without bibliogr. edition; 4,2–MB

References

External links 
 o.Univ.Prof. Dr. Reinhard Kapp. – Lebenslauf und Veröffentlichungen auf der Website der Universität für Musik und darstellende Kunst Wien
 

1947 births
Living people
People from Hof, Bavaria
20th-century German musicologists
21st-century German musicologists